We Re-Built This City was the sixth and final album by Canadian punk rock band Closet Monster, released in 2004. Mamma Anti-Fascisto: Never Surrender and Punk Rock Ruined our Lives were the two singles released from this album.

Track listing

"Mamma Anti-Fascisto: Never Surrender" 
"Convictions Of A Schoolyard Anarchist" 
"Punk Rock Ruined Our Lives" 
"Shitting In The Face Of This Western Disgrace" 
"The Empire Strikes Iraq" 
"Open Scene, Open Arms: Your Application Is Denied" 
"Summer Of '97"

2004 albums
Closet Monster albums